Dyakonovo is a rural locality (a village) in Botanovskoye Rural Settlement, Mezhdurechensky District, Vologda Oblast, Russia. The population was 11 as of 2002.

Geography 
Dyakonovo is located 33 km southwest of Shuyskoye (the district's administrative centre) by road. Slavyanka is the nearest rural locality.

References 

Rural localities in Mezhdurechensky District, Vologda Oblast